Lambdina vitraria is a moth of the  family Geometridae. It is found in North America, including Arizona and Utah.

The larva feeds on Quercus species, including Quercus gambelii.

References 

Ourapterygini
Moths described in 1883